"If She Don't Love You" is a debut song written by Trey Bruce and Marc Beeson, and recorded by American country music group The Buffalo Club.  It was released in January 1997 as the first single from their self-titled debut album.  The song reached #9 on the Billboard Hot Country Singles & Tracks chart.

Critical reception

The single received a positive review in Billboard, which stated, "This well-written tune has the same accessible pop/country feel that marked Restless Heart's best work, yet it boasts a fresh, different twist and a slightly rawer feel that works extremely well."

Chart performance
"If She Don't Love You" debuted at number 75 on the U.S. Billboard Hot Country Singles & Tracks for the week of January 18, 1997.

Year-end charts

References

1997 debut singles
1997 songs
The Buffalo Club songs
Songs written by Trey Bruce
Songs written by Marc Beeson
Song recordings produced by Barry Beckett